Juttadinteria deserticola is a species of plant in the family Aizoaceae. It is endemic to Namibia.  Its natural habitats are dry savanna, rocky areas, and cold desert.

References

Flora of Namibia
deserticola
Least concern plants
Taxonomy articles created by Polbot